is a 1999 Japanese horror film directed by Toshirō Inomata. It is based on a manga of the same name by Junji Ito. The film was originally a TV series consisting of three V-cinema episodes, later spliced into a feature film.

Originally titled 富江 恐怖の美少女 (Tomie kyōfu no bishōjo, literally "Tomie: Fearsome Beauty"),
the series was given Another Face as its new title as a film on VHS and DVD.

Plot
In the first episode, a man wearing a trench coat and eye patch follows a high school student named Tomie Kawakami. At school, Tomie's affection for her boyfriend ends up making him go mad, and he kills her and puts parts of her body in the trash to be thrown away. Miki, the ex of Tomie's boyfriend, is unaware of Tomie's death and so when Tomie shows up at school the next day, she does not realize anything is amiss, but Miki ends up berating Tomie for seducing the boyfriend while he was still dating her, which is why he left Miki. Tomie admits she never had real affection for her boyfriend, and when the boyfriend is revealed to be watching all along, a struggle ensues, and Tomie is thrown from the roof. The two go to bury her in the woods in a deep grave and begin making plans to conceal their work, but as they walk to school in the morning Tomie is miraculously there to confront them.

The second episode focuses on a photographer who has lost his passion for photography but regains it when he finds Tomie, this time a model/dancer of a sort at a bar. She resembles the girl from his past who gave him that passion, and he goes and talks to her. With her consent, he takes pictures of her, and asks her to be his model for a few more pictures, and she agrees; for the next two days he takes her out on a date and photographs her, and fails to notice that the man with the eye patch is back and watching Tomie. The photographer ends up taking Tomie home with him for the night after they both admit they have feelings for each other and kiss. The two have sex at the photographer's home, and after she falls asleep, he develops the photographs only to find that each one has two faces: Tomie's face and a ghoul's face in the photos. Convinced it is not his lens, he tells Tomie this and she tells him to kill her to prove she is not a ghost, as she would be unable to die if she was already dead. Although at first confused by her request and simply concerned Tomie may be haunted, the photographer ends up attacking her. Naturally, she does die, but when the photographer is transporting her body in his car she comes back to life and scares him out of the car. His running takes him to the place where he saw the girl from his past, and he discovers that both are Tomie when the previously-dead Tomie appears behind him. He falls to his death from the cliff and the previously-dead Tomie stands at his body, grinning and making a V sign while the Tomie from his past takes their picture.

The final episode has Tomie as a young woman likely in her early to mid-20s, about to be proposed to by her boyfriend. She is later nearly attacked by the man with the eye patch and sends her boyfriend to kill this man in order to prove his love for her. During his showdown with the man, the boyfriend is tasered into submission and we find out the trench coat wearing man, named Oota, is a former coroner for the police department, and Tomie was one of the bodies he had to perform an autopsy on. She stabbed his eye out in the process and crawled away; however none of his coworkers believe this and think that he instead took the corpse home for necrophilia-like purposes. He was fired for this, and his overly disappointed wife believed him to be a pervert and left him and took their children. For ruining his life, Oota seeks a way to kill Tomie once and for all. He gives the boyfriend his number and tells the boyfriend to call him if he also seeks a way to kill Tomie, and when he promises to kill Oota he shows him pictures of various other dead Tomies as proof. The boyfriend passes out in shock, and Tomie finds him and wakes him up again. After finding out he didn't kill Oota, Tomie throws his engagement ring on the ground and walks away. We see the boyfriend take out his knife and follow Tomie. Later, he contacts Oota and brings Tomie's body to an incinerator where Oota is waiting. Tomie's body lies in the back of his van but she is not dead, and when Oota takes her out, the boyfriend reveals it was a ruse and begins attacking Oota. Oota bests the boyfriend, knocking him out and likely breaking his leg, and when he tries to kill Tomie she convinces him not to and attempts to seduce him. Oota manages to get her body into the incinerator and burns it successfully, but her ashes soon gather together and create her face in the air before Oota. She tells him she will never die and that every single one of her ashes will become a new Tomie.

Cast
 Runa Nagai as Tomie Kawakami
 Akira Shirai as Ota
 Chie Tanaka as Miki
 Mitsuaki Kaneko as Takashi

Release
Tomie: Another Face was released in Japan on October 25, 1999.

References

References

External links
 Official website  
 
 Review at SaruDama

1999 films
1999 horror films
1990s Japanese television series
1999 Japanese television series debuts
2000 Japanese television series endings
Japanese horror fiction television series
Tomie (film series)
Films based on television series

ko:토미에